Dani Theunissen (born 20 December 1999) is a Dutch footballer who plays as a forward.

Club career
He made his Eerste Divisie debut for NEC on 1 September 2017 in a game against FC Eindhoven.

References

External links
 

1999 births
Footballers from Arnhem
Living people
Dutch footballers
NEC Nijmegen players
Helmond Sport players
Eerste Divisie players
Association football forwards